Lloyd Earl Warren (September 19, 1896 – December 5, 1934) was an American Democratic politician who served as a member of the Virginia Senate, representing the state's 3rd district from 1928 to 1932.

References

External links

1896 births
1934 deaths
Democratic Party members of the Virginia House of Delegates
Democratic Party Virginia state senators
Politicians from Portsmouth, Virginia
20th-century American politicians